Mamuka Japharidze (born 1962) is an artist from the capital of Georgia, Tbilisi. He is especially known for representing Georgia in the 48th Venice Biennale. He currently lives in Tbilisi and produces his art there.

Early life 

Japharidze was born in 1962 and raised in Tbilisi with his sister. His career was encouraged by his father, Jemali Japaridze, also an artist. He often collaborates with his artist and writer partner, Anthea Nicholson. He spends much of his time in England.

Collaborations/works 

 1998 ´Rubens Performance´, video projection, with Several Dancers Core, Atlanta, USA & Tbilisi 
 1995 ´Ramses Looking´, live action with fire, with Anthea Nicholson, Ramsey, Isle of Man & King Street Gallery, Bristol, UK
 1994 ´I Walked Here, Chagall´, live action with handmade paper, with Martyn Grimmer, Vitepsk, Belarus.

Organiser/curator 

 2003 ´Revive Time´, Kaki Tree project in Georgia, community and children's action. 
 1998 ´By Hand´, UK and Georgian artists exhibition, Caravanserei, Tbilisi 
 1998 Mirzaani International Artists Workshop: 21 artists for 3 weeks. 
 1998 ´Dejeuner sur l´herbe´, city actions, Tbilisi 
 1994 ´Silk Road´, Bristol, UK & Tbilisi artists exchange 
 1991/92 ´Black Market´, Georgian artists gallery show

Group exhibitions 

 2003 ´Opti-mystic Transportation Taxi´, travelling camera obscura, Appendix International Artists event, Tbilisi 
 2002 ´Table for Insects´, live action with insects, Gyumri Biennale, Armenia 
 2001 ´table´, public event, collaborative project for Year of the Artist, Bristol, UK 
 2001 ´East of Eden´, video project, Spacex Gallery, Exeter, UK; Gyumri Biennale, Armenia 
 2000 ´Georgian Nights, Australian Mornings´, live event, Camaflauge, Geneva, Switzerland 
 1999 ´From Tartarus Experience´, wall painting, Georgian Pavilion, Venice Biennale 
 1998 International Artists Symposium, wallpaper prints, Spike Island, Bristol, UK 
 1998 ´Transformation´, UNESCO, Paris 
 1996 ´Icon and Perception´, National Art Gallery, Tbilisi 
 1992 ´Heat and Conduct´, hand knitted jersey with floor piece, Mappin Gallery, Sheffield & Arnolfini, Bristol, UK

Solo exhibitions 

 2002 ´On the Skin´, public action with body prints, punch bag and sound design, Club 22 Tbilisi 
 2001 ´dopple eye´, video projection, Foundry, London 
 2000 ´In a Mirror´, video project, Rail Road Earth, Atlanta, USA 
 1994 ´Rolex´, painting and drawing series, Ethnographic Museum, Caravanserei, Georgia 
 1992 ´What is What´, performance, Ethnographic Museum, Caravanserei, Tbilisi

Philosophy and targets 

In 2003, he said:
"Since 1987 I have been working in an international arena; working with language; using language frame as the basic construction and conceptual base of a work. Often using bi-lingual sound-play to find new trans-cultural subjective meanings. The poetic language sound-play can be manifested as sound vibration, concrete text and also the actual object/event itself.

I am investigating the way that objects exist in a separate time/world beyond human´s utilitarian interpretation of time/object. The state of potential before objects/things are manifested is for me a real metaphysical state of existence. The idea of the object exists in ancient mythological dialogue and drama, which for me is still present. When the utilitarian conception of an object is cleared away, the deep metaphysical meaning is revealed.

One basic principle is an investigation of the threshold between an art event and ´non art´. And how the four-dimensional (space, time/metaphysical) aspects of the work in the actual moment of the event, are for me the deep points of realisation.

My target is the actual moment of an event and not towards building a product.

The medium is changeable and includes: media production, e.g. posters, cards (as part of an art work/event); happenings/public events; collecting and archiving images over long periods of time; video projection; photography; printmaking; texts; drawing; sound works."

References

External links 
 http://www.culturebase.net/artist.php?839

Artists from Georgia (country)
1962 births
Living people